Seychelles competed at the 2004 Summer Olympics in Athens, Greece, from 13 to 29 August 2004.

Athletics

Two athletes represented Seychelles in 2004.

Men

Women

Key
Note–Ranks given for track events are within the athlete's heat only
Q = Qualified for the next round
q = Qualified for the next round as a fastest loser or, in field events, by position without achieving the qualifying target
NR = National record
N/A = Round not applicable for the event
Bye = Athlete not required to compete in round

Boxing

One boxer represented Seychelles in 2004.

Canoeing

One canoeist represented Seychelles in 2004.

Sprint

Qualification Legend: Q = Qualify to final; q = Qualify to semifinal

Judo

One judoka represented Seychelles in 2004.

Sailing

One sailor represented Seychelles in 2004.

Open

M = Medal race; OCS = On course side of the starting line; DSQ = Disqualified; DNF = Did not finish; DNS= Did not start; RDG = Redress given

Swimming

Two swimmers represented Seychelles in 2004.

Men

Women

Weightlifting 

One weightlifter represented Seychelles in 2004.

References

External links
Official Report of the XXVIII Olympiad

Nations at the 2004 Summer Olympics
2004
Olympics